The James Madison Award is administered by the American Library Association, which describes the award:

The award named for President James Madison was established in 1989 and is presented annually on the anniversary of his birth to honor individuals or groups who have championed, protected and promoted public access to government information and the public's right to know at the national level.

Recipients
 Seamus Kraft, The OpenGov Foundation 2016
 Senator John Cornyn (R-TX), 2015
 President Barack Obama's Review Group on Intelligence and Communications Technologies, 2014
 Aaron Swartz, 2013 (posthumously) 
 Zoe Lofgren, 2012 
 Patrice McDermott, 2011
 Citizens for Responsibility and Ethics in Washington (CREW), 2010 - Co-Winner
 Meredith Fuchs, 2010
 Thomas M. Susman, 2009
 Russ Feingold, 2008
 Paul K. McMasters, 2007
 Steve Aftergood, 2006
 Richard M. Schmidt, 2005
 David Sobel, 2004  
 Former U.S. Congressman Steve Horn;  Government of Arlington County (VA), 2003
 Steven Garfinkel, retired director of the Information Security Oversight Office; John E. Moss the author of the Freedom of Information Act (awarded posthumously) 2002
 John D. Podesta, former White House Chief of Staff, 2001
 Larry Irving, former Assistant Secretary of Commerce for Communications and Information, 2000
 Board members and congressional sponsors of the President John F. Kennedy Assassination Records Review Board, including former Senator John Glenn and Representatives Dan Burton, Henry Waxman, and Louis Stokes and Board members: Honorable John R. Tunheim (chair), Henry F. Graff, Kermit L. Hall, William L. Joyce and Anna Kasten Nelson. 1999
 Ben Bagdikian, journalist, Wayne P. Kelley, former Superintendent of Documents of the Government Printing Office, Eliot Christian and the U.S. Geological Survey, National Library of Medicine. 1998
 George Soros, philanthropist and financier, 1997
 The National Information Infrastructure Advisory Council, 1996
 The Government Printing Office, the State of Maryland's Sailor Project, the Seattle (WA) Public Library, and the Internet Multicasting Service's Town Hall Project, 1995 
 Secretary of Energy Hazel O'Leary, and former ALA Washington Office Director Eileen D. Cooke, 1994
 The legislators who led the passage of P.L. 103-40, the GPO Access Act: Vice President Al Gore, original sponsor of the GPO Gateway to Government Act when he was in the Senate; Senators Wendell Ford (D-KY) and Ted Stevens (R-AK); Representatives Charlie Rose (D-NC) and Bill Thomas (R-CA),  1993  
 Journalist Nina Totenberg, author Scott Armstrong, and C-SPAN founder Brian Lamb,  1992
 Representative Don Edwards, 1991
 Senator Frank Lautenberg (D-NJ), Representative Henry Waxman (D-CA), journalist Philip Shabecoff, and the Office of Toxic Substances of the U.S. Environmental Protection Agency,  1990
 Senator Patrick Leahy, 1989

External links
 ALA page on the award, page on past recipients.

References

American Library Association awards
Awards established in 1986
Freedom of information in the United States